"Industrial Disease" is a song by British rock band Dire Straits, written by Mark Knopfler. It appeared on the band's 1982 album Love over Gold. The song was released as a single in the United States and as a rare B-side to "Private Investigations" on cassette tape in the United Kingdom.

Meaning
The song's title is a British term for work-related illness or disease, a frequent subject in British news media at the time. The significance of the phrase was obscure to listeners in the United States, where the term occupational disease is used instead.

The background and subject matter of the lyrics was ostensibly the decline of the British manufacturing industry in the early 1980s, describing strikes, clinical and economic depression, and societal dysfunction. However, the song is an extended metaphor, with the idea of the dehumanising routine and repetition of the nine-to-five itself as the real culprit of society's malaise. About halfway through the song, the narrator goes to the doctor, only to be told his own illness is diagnosed as industrial disease.

A reference to "brewer's droop" as a medical condition is an in-joke, using a British colloquial term for alcohol-related erectile dysfunction to allude to Brewers Droop, a 1970s pub rock band in which songwriter Mark Knopfler and drummer Pick Withers had played prior to Dire Straits.

Charts

References

1982 singles
Dire Straits songs
Songs written by Mark Knopfler
Song recordings produced by Mark Knopfler
1982 songs
Vertigo Records singles